Bangkok Mass Transit Authority, also known as BMTA, is the main operator of public transit buses within the Greater Bangkok area. It is the largest city bus system in Thailand. The Bangkok Mass Transit Authority offers bus and van routes throughout the city and its suburban provinces.

The BMTA is a state enterprise under Ministry of Transport that started operations on 1 October 1976 upon the purchase and combination of the transportation assets of private bus companies, most of which had faced crises due to sharply rising oil prices since 1973. The government, in 1975, addressed the crisis by setting up a public-private joint venture called the Metropolitan Transit Company, Limited, but the effort failed to materialize. It tried again in 1976 by setting up BMTA as a fully state-owned enterprise under the control of the transport ministry.

Since then, the organization has been the main operator of city buses. However, some private bus companies opted to continue their service on certain routes under joint service contracts with BMTA instead of selling their assets to the state. Despite government subsidies, BMTA has posted losses from day one, resulting in deteriorating quality of service.

About 
The BMTA service area covers the Bangkok metropolis and its suburban areas in the adjacent provinces of Nonthaburi, Samut Prakan, Pathum Thani, Nakhon Pathom, and Samut Sakhon. It serves approximately three million passengers per day. The service hours are 05:00-23:00, except for a 24-hr night-owl service on some routes. , BMTA owned a fleet of 3,005 buses—1,520 ordinary buses and 1,485 air-conditioned buses. In addition to BMTA-owned buses, there are 3,485 privately-owned contract buses, 1,113 contracted minibuses, 2,161 side-street songthaews, and 5,519 vans. In total, there were 15,857 buses and vans for 427 routes across eight zones.

 Zone 1: North (Hubs: Rangsit, Don Mueang, Bang Khen, Lam Luk Ka, Pathum Thani)
 Zone 2: Northeast (Hubs: Min Buri, Siam Park, Bang Kapi, Lat Krabang, Nong Jok, Prawet)
 Zone 3: Southeast (Hubs: Pak Nam, Samrong, Bangna, Bang Phli, Mega Bangna, Samut Prakan Crocodile Farm and Zoo)
 Zone 4: South and Central (Hubs: Khlong Toei, Thanon Tok, Sathu Pradit Pier, Rama III Rd, Rama IX Rd, Huai Khwang, Ratchadaphisek)
 Zone 5: Southwest (Hubs: Dao Khanong, Phra Pradaeng, Phra Samut Chedi, Samae Dam, Samut Sakhon, Chaeng Ron, Maha Chai Muang Mai)
 Zone 6: West (Hubs: Bangkhae, Thonburi, Wat Rai Khing & Samphran, Nakorn Pathom, Phasi Charoen, Sala Ya, Taling Chan)
 Zone 7: Northwest (Hubs: Nonthaburi, Pak Kret, Tha-it, Bang Yai, Bang Bua Thong, Nakhon In, Muang Thong Thani, Lak Si)
 Zone 8: Northeast and Central (Hubs: Siam Park, Bang Kapi, Ram Inthra, Lat Phrao, Huai Khwang, Chatuchak, Mo Chit, Bang Sue, Din Daeng, Ratchathewi)

Financials
For fiscal year 2017 ending 30 September 2017, the BMTA reported revenues of 8,114 million baht, total assets of 8,127 million baht, and a net profit of minus 110,550 million baht.

BMTA's poor financial performance has prompted the State Enterprise Policy Office (SEPO) to step in with a plan for "business rehabilitation". Its central strategies are the purchase of 3,000 new buses to halve fuel costs and lower maintenance costs, and the adoption of automated ticketing to make 5,000 ticket-takers redundant. The Finance Ministry may help defray the hundreds of billions of BMTA debt when the BMTA reaches profitability.

Bus routes

Fare collection 
The BMTA allows riders to board a bus and pay with cash or coupons. In 2017, the government planned to implement a common ticketing system across all mass transit modes, allowing passengers to pay with a single smart card known as the Mangmoom Card.

In December 2017, the BMTA abandoned a plan to install automated cash collection boxes as impractical, after having installed 800 of the devices. It halted the planned installation of the remaining 1,800 machines. The move prompted a Bangkok Post editorial to note that, "The fiasco reminds Bangkok commuters of just how poorly served they are and how inefficient and incompetent the agency [BMTA] is. Similar to its ageing bus fleet, the BMTA itself has reached a stage where its management desperately needs a revamp."

The cash box plan was part of the agency's 1.6 billion baht automated bus fare collection project that also covers the installation of e-ticket reading machines on all 2,600 buses serving Bangkok routes. Since October 2017, 800 buses has installed the cash boxes, which required passengers to feed in coins one-by-one. The "improvement" proved far too slow to be practicable.

The change would have resulted in the "replacement" of 2,600 bus conductors, according to the chairman of the Bangkok Mass Transit Authority. The chairman originally stated that he expected workers would take up early retirement packages once all the buses were equipped with cashless card readers.

Bus fleet 
BMTA operates air-conditioned and ordinary buses from various makers, most of which are Japanese. The air-conditioned bus fleet consists of buses from Hino, Isuzu, Daewoo, and Mercedes-Benz (standard and articulated). The ordinary bus fleet consists of buses from Hino, Isuzu, and Mitsubishi Fuso. Ordinary buses are being phased out. Most buses are diesel powered, but they are being converted to cleaner and cheaper natural gas (NGV). It operates new routes of NGV-powered vans, shuttling people between city center and suburban communities.

The BMTA has been working for 11 years to procure 489 natural gas-powered buses to replace its ageing fleet and is expected to complete the task in 2018. It plans to buy 35 electric buses and 2,476 hybrid buses in the future.

As of March 2021, the BMTA fleet consists of the following bus

Air-Conditioned Buses

Ordinary Buses

See also 
 Buses in Bangkok
 BRT (Bangkok)
 MRT
 Bus No. 8
 List of bus routes in Bangkok
 List of rapid transit systems

References

External links 
 Bangkok Mass Transit Authority
 Bangkok bus Club

Bus transport in Bangkok
Companies based in Bangkok
Transport companies established in 1976
1976 establishments in Thailand
State enterprises of Thailand